Devgad Fort, also called Janjira Devgad Fort, is a fort located 5 km from Devgad town, in Sindhudurg district, of Maharashtra. This fort is an important fort in Sindhudurg district. The fort is surrounded by sea from three side and to the south it is attached to the land.

History 
This fort was built by Dattajirao Angre in the year 1729. This fort was under the control of Kanhoji Angre for a longer period. Walter Brown of East India Company had tried to capture this fort with the help of Wadikar Sawants, however he suffered great losses in the pursuit. After the fall of Maratha empire, in April 1818 this fort was taken by a detachment of IV Rifles of British under the Colonel Imlack.

Features 

The lighthouse is situated on one side of the fort. Inside the fort is Ganesh temple, three cannons and the Bastions are in good state.

See also 
 List of forts in Maharashtra
 List of forts in India

References 

Forts in Maharashtra
Buildings and structures of the Maratha Empire
16th-century forts in India
Caves of Maharashtra
Tourist attractions in Konkan
Former populated places in India